The Shire of Tinana is a former local government area in the Wide Bay–Burnett area of Queensland, Australia. It is centred on Tinana, on the southern bank of the Mary River, with the Borough of Maryborough on the northern bank. It existed from 1880 to 1917.

History
On 11 November 1879, the Tinana Division was created as one of 74 divisions within Queensland under the Divisional Boards Act 1879 with a population of 2029.

On 14 September 1883, part of Tinana Division was separated to create the new Granville Division. On 8 November 1883, there was an adjustment of the boundaries between them.

With the passage of the Local Authorities Act 1902, the Tinana Division became the Shire of Tinana on 31 March 1903.

The Shire of Tinana was abolished on 17 Feb 1917 and its area was incorporated into the Shire of Tiaro.

Chairmen
 1893: John Parke of "Springrove Farm"
 1895-1898: John Parke (again)
 1916-1917: James Cran

References

External links
 

Former local government areas of Queensland
1880 establishments in Australia
1917 disestablishments in Australia